Lilián Heinz (born 26 June 1935) is an Argentine sprinter who competed in the 1952 Summer Olympics and won medals in two Pan American Games.

Heinz competed in the 1951 Pan American Games at the age of 15, winning the bronze medal in the 100 metres and the 4 x 100 metres relay. A year later Heinz competed in the 1952 Summer Olympics in Helsinki, Finland. She ran in the 100 metres and finished third in her first round heat, eliminating her from the competition. Just days later she took part in the 200 metres, again being eliminated at the heat stage after finishing fourth. Her final event in the Olympics was the 4 x 100 metres relay with teammates Lilian Buglia, Gladys Erbetta and Ana María Fontán. The team finished in third place behind Australia and the Netherlands and so did not progress to the final.

Heinz later competed in the 1955 Pan American Games in Mexico City, where she was part of the team that won the silver medal in the 4 x 100 metres relay.

References

1935 births
Living people
Athletes (track and field) at the 1951 Pan American Games
Athletes (track and field) at the 1952 Summer Olympics
Athletes (track and field) at the 1955 Pan American Games
Olympic athletes of Argentina
Pan American Games silver medalists for Argentina
Pan American Games bronze medalists for Argentina
Pan American Games medalists in athletics (track and field)
Medalists at the 1951 Pan American Games
Medalists at the 1955 Pan American Games
20th-century Argentine people